Mercer Lake, also known as Lake Mercer, is a man-made lake within Mercer County Park in West Windsor, Mercer County, New Jersey, United States.

History
The lake came into being with the 1975 construction of a dam to control flooding on the Assunpink Creek in nearby Trenton by the United States Department of Agriculture Soil Conservation Service (now the Natural Resources Conservation Service). The basin, now occupied by the lake, was excavated by crews building nearby Interstate 295 at no additional cost to taxpayers.

Rowing
The lake is the home of one of the US Olympic Rowing Team's training centers. It has played host to the 1988, 1992, 2004 and 2008 U.S. Olympic Team Trials for Rowing, in addition to USRowing National Team selection events, international regattas, and both collegiate and junior national championship regattas. The infrastructure and topography of the racecourse meets FISA standards and PNRA has the equipment necessary to host the world's largest regattas.

Water quality
One of cleanest bodies of water in central New Jersey, the lake still faces problems with pollution from nearby golf courses, and storm water runoff.

Fishing
Mercer Lake is home to many fish, including Largemouth Bass, White Crappie, Bluegill, Pumpkinseed Sunfish, Yellow Perch, Catfish, Shad, and Musky. In the past, the lake was stocked with Tiger Muskie. Fishing may be done from the banks or by use of a personal water craft.

In 2020 more fish have been caught in the first 6 months than in the past 5 years combined.

References

Reservoirs in New Jersey
Bodies of water of Mercer County, New Jersey
West Windsor, New Jersey